Urmila Bhatt (1 November 1933 – 22 February 1997) was an actress of Hindi cinema. She started acting in Drama Theatre. She joined Sangeet Kala Academy in Rajkot as a folk dancer and singer. It was during that time that her famous Gujarati drama Jesal Toral ran to more than a thousand performances. She acted in more than 75 Gujarati films and also in 15 to 20 Rajasthani movies. She had also played character roles in Hindi films for over two and a half decades (1960s to early 1990s). She had also acted in various television serials. She had also been honoured with numerous awards by the government of Gujarat.

Hindi films
After her success in theatre, she started doing Hindi films. In the late 1960s she did Gauri (1968), Sunghursh (1968) and Hamraaz (1967). A few other popular films done by her are Ankhiyon Ke Jharokhon Se (1978), Geet Gaata Chal (1975), Besharam (1978), Ram Teri Ganga Maili (1985), Balika Badhu (1976), Dhund (1973) and Alibaba Marjinaa (1977). Other than these films, she had done several other films. In most of her movies she played supporting characters. She had acted in 125 Hindi films . On television, she also played the role of Sita's mother "Maharani Sunaina in Ramanand Sagar's historic blockbuster serial Ramayan and that of Sharda Sharma in Rajshri Productions' TV Serial Paying Guest (1985). Apart from these two, she made episodic appearances in Shyam Bengal's Bharat Ek Khoj in 1989 and in Zee TV's Zee Horror Show in 1996.

Death
Bhatt was found murdered at her residence in Juhu on 22 February 1997. Officials suspected that robbery was the motive behind her murder.

Filmography

See also

List of Indian film actresses

References

External links
 

1934 births
1997 deaths
Indian film actresses
Actresses in Hindi cinema
Actresses from Dehradun
20th-century Indian actresses
People murdered in Maharashtra
Actresses from Mumbai
Indian stage actresses